Arthur J. Shallcross (1876 – 1950) was an English association football manager who managed Stoke City between February 1919 and March 1923.

Career
Shallcross played for his native Leek before becoming a Football League referee in 1895. He was appointed secretary-manager of Stoke in February 1919, in time for Stoke's first season back in the league since 1908. A steady season of mid-table followed in 1919–20 but Shallcross then angered the supporters with the seemingly unnecessary sale of Charlie Parker to Sunderland, but he did bring in Bob McGrory who would have a long career at the Victoria Ground.

After almost being relegated in 1920–21 Stoke finished 2nd in 1921–22 to gain a return to the First Division. Key to Stoke's success was the early season signing of the Broad brothers Tommy and Jimmy with the later scoring 27 goals. However any hope that it be the start of a sustained spell in the top-flight was quickly dashed as Stoke struggled all through the 1922–23 season and with relegation looming Shallcross was sacked in March 1923.

Manager statistics

Honours
 Football League Second Division runner-up: 1921–22

References

External links
 Stoke City managers at stokecityfc.com

1876 births
1950 deaths
English football managers
Stoke City F.C. managers
English Football League managers